Manasseh Damukana Sogavare (born 17 January 1956) is the sixth and current Prime Minister of the Solomon Islands, serving since 24 April 2019. He previously held the office in 2000–2001, 2006—2007 and 2014–2017; in all he has served over nine years as prime minister. Before becoming prime minister, Sogavare served in the National Parliament representing East Choiseul since 1997.

Early life
Sogavare, who is a Seventh-day Adventist was born in Popondetta, Northern Province, Papua New Guinea on 17 January 1955 to missionary parents from Choiseul Island, Solomon Islands. He has four older brothers: Moses, Samson, John and Jacob. Later in life, Manasseh and his older brother Jacob moved to the Solomon Islands.

Political career

Early career
Sogavare was Permanent Secretary of the Ministry of Finance from February 1994 to October 1996. Prior to his election to Parliament, he served as the Commissioner of Inland Revenue, Director of the Central Bank of the Solomon Islands, and Chairman of the Solomon Islands National Provident Fund. He was first elected to the National Parliament from the East Choiseul constituency in the 6 August 1997 election.

Under Prime Minister Bartholomew Ulufa'alu, Sogavare became Minister for Finance and Treasury in 1997 but was dismissed from that post by Ulufa'alu in mid-July 1998. Sogavare said that he was shocked at the dismissal, as he could see no reason for it and no reason was given, and he demanded an explanation. A few days later, Ulufa'alu said that the decision was motivated by the need for the government to keep the numbers to stay in power. In early August 1998, Sogavare withdrew his support for Ulufa'alu and his government, accusing Ulufa'alu of authoritarian and hypocritical leadership and of emphasizing stability only to protect himself.

Sogavare was chosen as deputy leader of the opposition in late September 1998, with Solomon Mamaloni as leader. Following Mamaloni's death in January 2000, Sogavare was elected as leader of the opposition later that month. He received the votes of all ten members of the opposition who were present.

Prime Minister (2000–2001)
Sogavare was elected as Prime Minister by parliament on 30 June 2000, with 23 votes in favor and 21 against, after Ulufa'alu was captured by rebels and forced to resign. He served as Prime Minister until 17 December 2001.

Out of office (2001–2006)
His party won only three seats in the 2001 general election, but Sogavare was re-elected to his seat in Parliament.

In Parliament, Sogavare was a member of the Bills and Legislation Committee in 2002 and again from 2005 to April 2006.

Following the 2006 general election, Sogavare led the Solomon Islands Social Credit Party into a coalition to oust Prime Minister Allan Kemakeza's chosen successor Snyder Rini, but there was much disagreement about who should be its candidate for Prime Minister. On 18 April 2006, he received 11 of 50 votes to become Prime Minister, placing him third. He then switched his support to Rini, allowing Rini to become Prime Minister while Sogavare became part of the coalition and was named Minister for Commerce, Industries and Employment.

Prime Minister (second term, 2006–2007)
Following Rini's resignation on 26 April 2006, Sogavare decided to attempt again to become Prime Minister. This time the opponents of Kemakeza and Rini united behind him, and in parliamentary vote on 4 May 2006, he received 28 votes, defeating the government candidate Fred Fono, who received 22 votes. Sogavare was immediately sworn in. His main tasks included organizing the recovery from rioting that took place during Rini's time as Prime Minister.

On 11 October 2006, Sogavare survived a no-confidence vote in parliament; the motion, introduced by Fono, was supported by 17 members of parliament, while 28 voted against it. The no-confidence vote was prompted by deteriorating relations with Australia. Sogavare had expelled the Australian High Commissioner Patrick Cole in September and defended the Solomons' suspended attorney general, Julian Moti, who Australia wanted extradited to face child sex charges there. Moti presently faces charges in the Solomons for illegally entering the country. On 13 October, Sogavare threatened to expel Australia from an assistance mission in the Solomons, and a week later Australian peacekeepers from the Regional Assistance Mission to Solomon Islands raided Sogavare's office (when he was not present) looking for evidence related to the Moti case.

On 13 December 2007, Sogavare was defeated in a parliamentary vote of no confidence; the motion against him received 25 votes, with 22 in opposition. He remained in office in a caretaker capacity until the election of a new Prime Minister on 20 December, when opposition candidate Derek Sikua was elected, defeating Patteson Oti who had been Foreign Minister under Sogavare. On the same date, Sogavare became Leader of the Opposition.

Leader of the Opposition (2007–2014)
In 2010, Sogavare and eight other MPs established the Ownership, Unity and Responsibility Party, which won three seats in the 2010 general election.

Prime Minister (third term, 2014–2017)

Following the 19 November, 2014 general election, Sogavere became Prime Minister for the third time. On 22 September 2017 Sogavare spoke at the United Nations General Assembly. He condemned North Korea for their testing of ballistic missiles. He also condemned Indonesia for violence in West Papua. On 7 November 2017, seventeen members of his Democratic Coalition for Change voted against him in another motion of no-confidence. The lawmaker who submitted the motion of no confidence, Derek Sikua, claimed that Sogavere had lost touch with reality and become fixated on conspiracy theories, while Sogavere attributed the defections to a proposed anti-graft bill, saying that some MPs were afraid it would lead to them being imprisoned. Sogavere remained as Acting Prime Minister until Rick Houenipwela was elected on 15 November 2017.

Prime Minister (fourth term, 2019–present)

On 24 April 2019, he was once again elected Prime Minister with more than half the vote. There is controversy surrounding this election since a court issued an injunction just before the vote was to begin. After Sogavare was re-elected there was rioting in Honiara forcing shops and offices to close. Additionally, rioters did damage to the Pacific Casino Hotel which was used by Sogavare as his campaign headquarters.

On 16 September 2019, Sogavare's government recognised the People's Republic of China, switching recognition from the Republic of China after 36 years. In a statement Sogavare announced the decision as representing an advance of Solomon Islands national interests, an outcome of a bi-partisan taskforce to investigate and confirm the facts surrounding the 'One China Principle', and reporting by the Ministry of Foreign Affairs and External Trade. Responding to questions about caucus unity on the decision, Sogavare presented it as "a collective agreement agreed to by all the Democratic Coalition Government for Advancement (DCGA) coalition MPs elected into the 11th parliament, conducted in a very open and transparent manner as far as government caucus is concerned". The decision caused significant political and public debate in Solomon Islands. In the wake of the decision and in light of their abstaining from the parliamentary vote, several members of parliament were removed by Sogavare. Planning Minister and former Prime Minister Rick Hou claimed Sogavare lied about the process, claiming the decision was pre-determined. Hou was sacked by Sogavare on the week of 27 September, Sogavare claiming Hou had tried to bribe MPs. Deputy Prime Minister John Maneniaru and Education Minister Dean Kuku were terminated, with Police Minister Lanelle Tanagada opting to resign.

Malaita Province, however, continued to be supported by Taiwan and the United States, the latter sending US$25 million of aid to the island in 2020. The premier of Malaita Province, Daniel Suidani, also held an independence referendum in 2020 which the national government has dismissed as illegitimate. 

Riots broke out in November 2021 during which anti-government protesters, most of them from Malaita Province, burnt down buildings adjoining the Solomon Islands Parliament Building, while also looting Honiara's Chinatown. Sogavare himself resisted calls to resign, warning that the rioters would "face consequences" while also accusing them of being "politically motivated".

Australia responded to the unrest by deploying Australian Federal Police and Australian Defence Force personnel following a request from the Sogavare government under the Australia-Solomon Islands Bilateral Security Treaty. Papua New Guinea and Fiji also sent peacekeepers.

On 6 December 2021, he survived a motion of no confidence in the National Parliament.

Church dedication
Sogavare dedicated the Sogavare Memorial Seventh-day Adventist Church in memory of his father Sagavare Loko.

References

External links

|-

|-

|-

|-

1956 births
Finance Ministers of the Solomon Islands
Independent politicians of the Solomon Islands
Leaders of the Opposition (Solomon Islands)
Living people
Members of the National Parliament of the Solomon Islands
Ownership, Unity and Responsibility Party politicians
People from Choiseul Province
People from Oro Province
People's Progressive Party (Solomon Islands) politicians
Prime Ministers of the Solomon Islands
Solomon Islands Seventh-day Adventists
Solomon Islands Social Credit Party politicians